Mohamed Djila is a former Malian international footballer of the 1980s and 1990s.

Djila spent much of his career with Stade Malien.

References

Year of birth missing (living people)
Living people
Malian footballers
Stade Malien players
Association football midfielders
Mali international footballers
21st-century Malian people
Place of birth missing (living people)